Eliran Asao (born February 3, 1985) is a former Israeli footballer. Asao played in Hapoel Ashkelon, Bnei Yehuda and Hapoel Ramat Gan, among others, before having to retire through injury in 2011.

References

External links
Eliran Asao at Soccerdata.net

1985 births
Living people
Israeli footballers
Hapoel Ashkelon F.C. players
Hapoel Ramat Gan F.C. players
Bnei Yehuda Tel Aviv F.C. players
Maccabi Ahi Nazareth F.C. players
Maccabi Kiryat Malakhi F.C. players
Israeli Premier League players
Liga Leumit players
Footballers from Ashkelon
Association football forwards